The Music Bank Chart is a record chart on the South Korean KBS television music program Music Bank. Every week, the show awards the best-performing single on the chart in the country during its live broadcast.

In 2012, 24 singles achieved a number one on the chart and 23 music acts were awarded first-place trophies.

Chart history

References 

2012 in South Korean music
2012 record charts
Lists of number-one songs in South Korea